Biliran may refer to the following places in the Philippines:

 Biliran, island province
 Biliran, Biliran, municipality in the province
 Biliran (volcano), the major volcano of the island province
 Biliran Airport, airport in the province